Bangladesh Air Force Welfare Trust (BAFWT) is a Bangladesh government and Bangladesh Air Force supported trust that works for the welfare of retired air force personnel and their families. Air Chief Marshal Shaikh Abdul Hannan, Chief of the Air Staff of the Bangladesh Air Force, is the Present chairperson of Bangladesh Air Force Welfare Trust.

History 
Bangladesh Air Force Welfare Trust was established in 2010 under Shah Mohammad Ziaur Rahman, Chief of Air Staff and first chairperson of the trust. He served from 23 September 2010 to 12 June 2012. He was replaced by Muhammad Enamul Bari who served till 12 June 2015. Bari was replaced by Abu Esrar who served till 12 June 2018 and replaced by newly appointed chief of Bangladesh Air Force Masihuzzaman Serniabat.

Bangabandhu Sheikh Mujibur Rahman Aviation and Aerospace University is being developed by Bangladesh Air Force Welfare Trust and headed by the chief of Bangladesh Air Force.

On 14 June 2020, Bangladesh Air Force Welfare Trust arranged special flights of Bangladesh Biman and US-Bangla Airlines to bring in Bangladeshis trapped in Dubai aimed the COVID-19 pandemic. Similar flights were arranged to bring in Bangladeshis trapped in the United Kingdom, Malaysia, and Doha.

In March 2021, Bangladesh government allocated 1.24 billion taka for the development work at BSCIC Chemical Industrial Park, Munshiganj owned by Bangladesh Small and Cottage Industries Corporation. The government recommended that the work be given to Bangladesh Air Force Welfare Trust and Dockyard and Engineering Works Limited, owned by Bangladesh Navy, through Direct Purchase Procedure.

See also 

 Bangladesh Army Welfare Trust

References 

2010 establishments in Bangladesh
Organisations based in Dhaka
Government agencies of Bangladesh
Government-owned companies of Bangladesh